Independence Township is a township in Dunklin County, in the U.S. state of Missouri.

Independence Township was erected in 1845.

References

Townships in Missouri
Townships in Dunklin County, Missouri